A spider web is a silken web built by a spider.

Spider Web(s) or Spider's Web may also refer to:

Film
The Spider's Web (1926 film), an American silent film
The Spider's Web (serial), 1938 Columbia Pictures film serial
The Spider's Web (1960 film), 1960 film directed by Godfrey Grayson
Web of the Spider, 1971 Italian horror film
Spiderweb (film), 1976 short film starring Nigel Hawthorne
Spider's Web (1982 film), a British television film based on Agatha Christie's play
Spider's Web (1989 film), a West German film directed by Bernhard Wicki
Spider's Web (2002 film), starring and produced by Kari Wuhrer

Music
"Spiderwebs" (song), a 1995 song by No Doubt
"Spider's Web" (song), a 2006 song by Katie Melua
"Spider Web", a 1995 song by Joan Osborne from her album Relish

Other
Spider's Web (play), a 1954 play by Agatha Christie
Spider's Web (novel), a 2000 novelisation of the Agatha Christie play, by Charles Osborne
Spiderweb Software, an independent video game developer

See also

Spider Webb (disambiguation), for a list of people nicknamed "Spider Webb"
Cobweb (disambiguation)
Spider (disambiguation)
Web (disambiguation)